|}

The Pertemps Network Final is a Premier Handicap National Hunt hurdle race in Great Britain which is open to horses aged five years or older. It is run on the New Course at Cheltenham over a distance of about 3 miles (2 miles 7 furlongs and 213 yards, or 4,785 metres), and during its running there are twelve hurdles to be jumped. It is a handicap race, and it is scheduled to take place each year during the Cheltenham Festival in March.

History
The event was established in 1974, when it was introduced as a replacement for a previous race at the Festival, the George Duller Handicap Hurdle. It was originally sponsored by Coral, and for much of its early history it was titled the Coral Golden Hurdle Final. It has had various sponsors since 1993, and the latest of these, Pertemps, began supporting the race in 2002.

The Pertemps Network Final is served by a series of qualifier races which take place during the preceding five months. A horse has to be placed in the first four in a qualifier race to be eligible to run in the Final. In the 2022–23 season there were 15 qualifier races, all in Great Britain. In previous seasons qualifiers have included races in Ireland and France.

The race was raised from Listed to Grade Three status from 2018 and reclassified as a Premier Handicap from the 2023 running when Grade 3 status was renamed by the British Horseracing Authority.

Records
Most successful horse (3 wins):
 Willie Wumpkins – 1979, 1980, 1981

Leading jockey (3 wins):
 Jim Wilson – Willie Wumpkins (1979, 1980, 1981)
 Davy Russell – Mall Dini (2016), Presenting Percy (2017), Delta Work (2018)
 Barry Geraghty – Inching Closer (2003), Sire Du Berlais (2019, 2020)

Leading trainer (4 wins):
 Jonjo O'Neill – Danny Connors (1991), Inching Closer (2003), Creon (2004), Holywell (2013)

Winners
 Weights given in stones and pounds.

See also
 Horse racing in Great Britain
 List of British National Hunt races

References

 racenewsonline.co.uk – Racenews Archive (21 February 2008).
 
 Racing Post:

External links
 Race Recordings 

National Hunt races in Great Britain
Cheltenham Racecourse
National Hunt hurdle races
Recurring sporting events established in 1974
1974 establishments in England